Marco Michael Andretti (born March 13, 1987) is an American auto racing driver who drives the No. 98 car for Andretti Herta Autosport part-time in the IndyCar Series. He is the third generation of the famous Andretti racing family. He is the 2022 SRX Series champion.

Early career

Marco was born to Sandra Spinozzi and eventual IndyCar champion Michael Andretti. Other Andretti family members also have had success in various categories of racing.

Andretti won eight races in the 2003 Barber Formula Dodge Eastern Championship, and was champion in the Barber National and Southern class the following year.

Still barely out of high school, he raced in the Star Mazda series in 2005 and also made six starts in the Indy Pro Series. He won three times – at St. Petersburg, the Liberty Challenge, and Sonoma – and finished 10th in points despite only starting half the races.

Motorsports journalist Gordon Kirby suggested at the Champ Car finale in Mexico City that the youngest Andretti would be replacing Dan Wheldon in his No. 26 Jim Beam Dallara-Honda for 2006 with Michael Andretti coming out of retirement to run a fifth car for his Andretti Green Racing team at the Indianapolis 500.  Though a novel proposition to some, it was later confirmed in a December 15 press conference that he would move up to the Indy Racing League full-time as the youngest driver in series history and would trade sponsors – the New York Stock Exchange and Motorola – with Dario Franchitti as Andretti was not old enough to run an alcohol-sponsored car.

IndyCar Series

2006
In his rookie start on March 26, 2006, at Homestead-Miami Speedway in the No. 26 New York Stock Exchange Dallara Honda, Andretti started 13th but broke a halfshaft in his first pitstop, eliminating him from the race.

With his Rookie of the Year performance in May at the Indianapolis 500, he became the third Andretti to finish in the top five in his first Indianapolis 500 appearance, after father Michael (5th in 1984 Indianapolis 500) and grandfather Mario, who finished third in 1965. Andretti finished second to Sam Hornish Jr. in the second-closest finish in Indianapolis 500 history at a margin of 0.0635 seconds.

On August 27, 2006, Andretti became the youngest winner – at the age of  – of a major open-wheel racing event (later to be replaced by Graham Rahal) as he scored his first career Indy Racing League victory at Infineon Raceway in Sonoma, California. He held the record until April 2008, when Graham Rahal won the 2008 Honda Grand Prix of St. Petersburg aged 74 days younger. Andretti's win established him as the 2006 Bombardier Rookie of the Year.

2007

The 2007 season was not as successful for Andretti. He failed to finish ten times and only completed 7 races. The team struggled to find balance on  ovals, with accidents eliminating him from the races in Japan, Indianapolis, Milwaukee, and Chicago, as well as the Mid Ohio road course. After finishing second at Michigan, Andretti finished eleventh place overall with 350 points.

2008
Andretti ran his first night race at Homestead-Miami Speedway, the first race of the 2008 season, with a 2nd-place finish behind Scott Dixon. He also led the most laps of the race – leading 85 – and received an additional three points. At St. Petersburg, Andretti snapped a half-shaft on his car trying to leave the pits, causing him to retire. In the third race of the season at Motegi, Japan, Andretti spun out on the first lap of the race. At the 2008 Indianapolis 500, Andretti finished third, after leading several laps. During the race, he passed teammate, Tony Kanaan, who then crashed into the wall, blaming Andretti.

A week later he captured his first IndyCar Series pole at the Milwaukee Mile and became the youngest IndyCar pole winner at the time – at the age of  – but crashed out with 3 laps to go in the race. His car slipped up the track, collecting Ed Carpenter, which in turn caused Vítor Meira to go airborne as he drove over Andretti's tire. The eventual winner, Ryan Briscoe just missed the wreckage, as Andretti finished 21st. At Texas Motor Speedway, Andretti had one of the best cars and was able to drive the high line all night, but Ryan Hunter-Reay and Andretti made contact with just a few laps to go.

Andretti finished third at Iowa, and then ran a strong race at Richmond but lost position when he pitted under green and a subsequent caution allowed the race leaders to pit under yellow; he finished ninth. Andretti finished fifth at Watkins Glen, before mechanical failure caused his car to crash out at Nashville. He also raced earlier the same day in the American Le Mans Series race at Lime Rock Park. At Mid-Ohio, Andretti got caught up in a four-car wreck on a restart on lap 42 which ended his race, before a 17th-place finish at Edmonton after contact with his teammate Danica Patrick. At Kentucky, Andretti took the lead from Scott Dixon, but as the race neared its end, all drivers had to pit for more fuel and Dixon took the win, while Andretti finished third. Andretti failed to finish higher than eighth in the final three races, as he finished seventh in points.

2009

The 2009 season began on two street circuits, allowing Andretti to show the benefits of his A1 Grand Prix experience. At St. Petersburg he tangled late in the race with veteran Alex Tagliani, finishing 13th, but overcame a 19th place start in Long Beach to finish 6th due to a different pitting sequence. This was Andretti's first time at Long Beach, a circuit at which both his father and grandfather won multiple times. After a 6th-place finish at Kansas. Andretti looked to Indianapolis, where he had been 2nd and 3rd in two of his three starts. Starting 8th, Andretti attempted to pass KV Racing Technology's Mario Moraes on the outside of the South chute between Turns 1 and 2. Moraes moved towards the wall, apparently unaware that Andretti was outside of him, and both cars collected the wall. Both Andretti and Moraes expressed their displeasure with each other in their on-air interviews. Andretti called the second-year driver "clueless" and said that "he doesn't get it and never will. I should have known who I was racing with."

The remainder of the year did not yield much success, as Andretti's best finish of the year was 4th at Texas. He continued his improved form on the road and street courses, finishing 5th at Watkins Glen, 8th in his first race in Toronto – where his father won a record seven times – and 6th at Mid-Ohio before finishing 8th in the final standings.

2011–2012
In 2011, Andretti placed 9th at Indianapolis after starting 27th. On June 25, 2011, Andretti won his second IndyCar Series race at Iowa Speedway. It was his first win in 79 races since his win at Sonoma Raceway in 2006.

The 2012 season was a struggle for Andretti. He started the year with 14th place at St. Petersburg, 11th at Alabama, 25th at Long Beach, and 14th at São Paulo. He led the most laps (59) at Indianapolis but hit the Turn 1 wall on Lap 188. Andretti continued the season with 11th at Detroit, 17th at Texas, 15th at Milwaukee, and a best finish of the season at Iowa, where he finished 2nd. Following his runner-up at Iowa, he had 16th at Toronto, 14th at Edmonton, 8th at Mid-Ohio, and 25th place at Sonoma. At Baltimore, Andretti made another finish in the back of the field, finishing 14th. Just as the season was about to end, he achieved the second pole position of his career at Fontana, finishing the race 8th. Andretti finished 16th on the point standings.

2013

Andretti started the 2013 season with a third-place finish at St. Petersburg. This was followed by 2 seventh-place finishes at Barber and Long Beach, matching his top-ten tally from the 2012 season. In the fourth race of the season at São Paulo, Andretti finished third and was able to move to second in the championship thirteen points behind Takuma Sato. He also led his first seven laps of the season. At the Indy 500, Andretti qualified 3rd and was consistently in the top 5 throughout the race. He led 31 laps and finished 4th after two late yellow flags that prevented him from moving forward in the field. After the race, Andretti said he was "frustrated" with the finish because he had not been below fourth all race. However, after the 500 he took the points lead by 11 points over Takuma Sato.

He continued his season with the first doubleheader at Detroit, finishing 20th in the first race – his lowest finish of the season – and 6th in the second race, marking improvement between the two. At Texas, he performed relatively well, staying within the top 10 for most of the race, and later finishing 5th. He claimed his third pole position at Milwaukee, but despite his success in qualifying, his engine blew after the first pit stop, leaving him with a 20th-place finish, before he finished ninth at Iowa. At Pocono, where his grandfather and father had once raced, he was at the top of his game, setting the track record for the fastest lap, and gaining a 4th career pole. Despite leading early in the race, he faded to a 10th-place finish in the end. At the Toronto doubleheader, he qualified and finished in the top 10, staying consistently well during the race. He finished fourth in race one, and finished ninth in the other race at Toronto, without any other events altering his finish. At Mid-Ohio, he finished 9th, without having many eventful occurrences throughout the race. He finished the season fifth in points.

2014–2017
In 2015, Andretti drove in the Buenos Aires ePrix for Andretti Autosport, he finished 12th.

2018

On December 7, 2017, Andretti Autosport announced plans for Andretti to swap car numbers with teammate Alexander Rossi for the 2018 season. Rossi will move to the No. 27 team while Andretti takes over Rossi's No. 98.

2020
Following disappointing 2018 and 2019 seasons in which he failed to secure any podium finishes, Andretti qualified for the pole position at the 2020 Indianapolis 500, posting an average speed of 231.068MPH—the first time an Andretti had sat on the pole for the Indy 500 since his grandfather Mario in 1987. The high point in his season proved short-lived, however, as he quickly faded after the race's start and ended up finishing 13th. Andretti would finish no higher than 10th during the pandemic-shortened 2020 season.

2021
In January 2021, Andretti announced that he will "step away" from full-time IndyCar racing, though he will continue to work with the Andretti Autosport team in a testing and development role. He placed 19th in the 2021 Indianapolis 500.

Sponsorship 
In February 2018 U.S. Concrete announced that they will be sponsoring Marco Andretti in six of the upcoming races including the Indianapolis 500 and the GP of Long Beach other sponsors include Verizon and PennGrade Motor Oil.

Formula One

Honda Racing F1 tests
Honda Racing F1 announced in December 2006 that Andretti would be presented with an opportunity to test their Formula One car, and on December 15, Andretti drove their Formula One car at Jerez in Spain. Honda sporting director Gil de Ferran commented that he had done a good job. Andretti said that he had greatly enjoyed the test but also told reporters that he wishes to enter Formula One only after he has won the Indianapolis 500.

On February 7–8, 2007 Andretti participated in a second Honda Racing F1 test for two days in Jerez, Spain. As in the previous test, Andretti drove the team's 2006 Formula One car. His (unofficial) fastest lap of the day on February 7 was less than 1.5 seconds slower than Honda team driver Jenson Button's fastest time. His (unofficial) fastest time on February 8, in changeable conditions, was less than one second slower than that of the 2005 and 2006 Formula One World Drivers' Champion Fernando Alonso's fastest lap, although several seconds slower than Honda driver Rubens Barrichello.

American Le Mans Series

12 Hours of Sebring
Andretti drove in the ALMS Sebring 12-hour endurance race for the Andretti Green Racing XM Satellite Radio car in March 2008. He was able to put in times in the 1-minute 48-second range that neither of his co-drivers was able to match. Although the car was retired early from the race, it was in the position for a podium finish.

On July 12, 2008, Andretti raced in the American LeMans race at Lime Rock Park, Conn in the AGR XM Acura. Later that same day, he raced in the IndyCar Series race in Nashville.

Andretti, Franck Montagny, and Tony Kanaan raced at the Petit Le Mans on October 4, 2008. A late-race incident retired the #26 XM Radio Acura early, with a seventh-place finish in LMP2 and 16th overall.

GRAND-AM Rolex Sports Car Series
Andretti made his Rolex Sports Car Series debut in the 2012 24 Hours of Daytona, driving the No. 2 Starworks Motorsport Riley-Ford with Ryan Hunter-Reay, Michael Valiante, Scott Mayer and Miguel Potolicchio, finishing 10th overall.

SRX Racing
After stepping away from full-time IndyCar racing, Andretti joined Tony Stewart and Ray Evernham's new Superstar Racing Experience where he would run the full six-race season in the #98 stock car. Andretti would perform exceptionally well in the series, with him winning the race in Slinger Speedway late in the season. It was his first victory in any form of motorsports since his final IndyCar win in 2011. 

Andretti won the 2022 SRX Series championship, besting Ryan Newman by two points. The championship victory came despite not winning a race during the course of the year.

A1 Grand Prix

2008–09 season

On November 3, 2008, Andretti was confirmed to be racing for A1 Team USA at the second round of the 2008–09 A1 Grand Prix season. Andretti was given the opportunity to race after Andretti Green Racing was revealed to be taking over the management of A1 Team USA starting with the 2008–09 season, and his father Michael Andretti became seat holder.

Formula E
Andretti competed for Andretti Autosport in the fourth round of the 2014–15 Formula E season in Buenos Aires, replacing Matthew Brabham.  For the fifth round in Miami Andretti was replaced by Scott Speed.

Racing record

American open–wheel racing results
(key) (Races in bold indicate pole position)

Skip Barber National Championship

Star Mazda

Indy Lights

IndyCar Series
(key)

* Season still in progress.

 1 Run on same day.
 2 The Las Vegas Indy 300 was abandoned after Dan Wheldon died from injuries sustained in a 15-car crash on lap 11.

Indianapolis 500

Complete American Le Mans Series results

Complete A1 Grand Prix results
(key)

24 Hours of Le Mans results

Superstar Racing Experience
(key) * – Most laps led. 1 – Heat 1 winner. 2 – Heat 2 winner.

 Season still in progress

Complete IMSA SportsCar Championship results
(key) (Races in bold indicate pole position; races in italics indicate fastest lap)

NASCAR 
(key) (Bold – Pole position awarded by qualifying time. Italics – Pole position earned by points standings or practice time. * – Most laps led. ** – All laps led.)

Xfinity Series

Personal life
Off the track, Marco spends his time in Nazareth, Pennsylvania, having purchased his childhood home from his father, Michael, for $2 million.

In September 2017, after the conclusion of the 2017 IndyCar Series, Marco married his long-time girlfriend, model Marta Krupa, sister of model and former Real Housewives of Miami star Joanna Krupa. On December 11, 2021, Andretti announced on Instagram that he and Krupa were "parting ways in a very friendly way."

References

External links

 
 
 Marco Andretti at IndyCar

-

1987 births
Living people
24 Hours of Daytona drivers
24 Hours of Le Mans drivers
A1 Team USA drivers
American Le Mans Series drivers
Marco Michael
Formula E drivers
Indianapolis 500 drivers
Indianapolis 500 Rookies of the Year
Indianapolis 500 polesitters
Indy Lights drivers
IndyCar Series drivers
North American Formula Renault drivers
Notre Dame High School (Easton, Pennsylvania) alumni
People from Nazareth, Pennsylvania
Indy Pro 2000 Championship drivers
Racing drivers from Pennsylvania
Rolex Sports Car Series drivers
Supercars Championship drivers
American people of Italian descent
Andretti Autosport drivers
Bryan Herta Autosport drivers
A1 Grand Prix drivers
WeatherTech SportsCar Championship drivers
Rebellion Racing drivers
Starworks Motorsport drivers
Kelly Racing drivers
Sportspeople from Northampton County, Pennsylvania